Raymond Sokolov (born 1 August 1941) is a U.S. journalist who has written extensively about food. He wrote the "Eating Out" column for The Wall Street Journal's weekend edition from 2006 until March 2010.

Early life and education
Sokolov grew up in the U.S. city of Detroit, and, while still in elementary school, finished 26th then 2nd in consecutive years in the National Spelling Bee in 1952 and 1953. He attended secondary school at Cranbrook, in suburban Detroit (Bloomfield Hills), whence he graduated in 1959.  After graduating from Harvard College summa cum laude in classics, and spending a year as a Fulbright Scholar at Wadham College, Oxford, Sokolov spent two years back at Harvard pursuing a doctorate in classics. In 1965 he passed his orals.

Career

In 1965, Sokolov began work as foreign correspondent for Newsweek Magazine in its Paris bureau.  In summer 1967, he returned to the U.S. with Newsweek as an arts writer.

In 1971, he became restaurant critic and food editor of the New York Times, where his pieces covered the decor, lore, and politics of New York restaurants as well as the productions of their kitchens. His reviews first noted the arrival of Sichuanese and Hunanese food in North America. He was the first writer in English to notice nouvelle cuisine in France.

In 1975 he left the Times to pursue a career as a freelance writer from his home in Brooklyn Heights. In 1981 became editor of Book Digest, then the founding editor of the Wall Street Journal'''s daily Leisure and Arts page, a post he held until 2002. He continues to write about food for national publications.

Works

Sokolov has written several cookbooks, including The Cook's Canon: 101 Classic Recipes Everyone Should Know, which includes recipes from the world's cuisines that Sokolov terms as being necessary to "culinary literacy," as well as brief essays.  Other works include The Saucier's Apprentice (1976), a highly regarded cookbook on the hierarchy of French sauces, Why We Eat What We Eat: How the Encounter between the New World and the Old Changed the Way Everyone on the Planet Eats (1991), and a biography of A. J. Liebling, Wayward Reporter (1980).

His long-running column "A Matter of Taste," on the Americas' foodways for the American Museum of Natural History's Natural History injected some researched facts and logical deduction into the highly fanciful traditional histories of cooking and helped lead to the revival of interest in American regional specialties. Some of the columns have been collected as Fading Feast: A Compendium of Disappearing American Regional Foods (1981).

Personal

In 1980 he married Johanna Hecht, a member of the curatorial staff of the Metropolitan Museum of Art.

He lives in New York City.

External links
Raymond Sokolov - One man's meat is another man's person an article on cannibalism from Natural History October 1974

Bibliography

Collected in: American Food Writing: An Anthology with Classic Recipes'', ed. Molly O'Neill (Library of America, 2007) 

1941 births
Living people
Harvard College alumni
American food writers
American male journalists
Journalists from Michigan
The Wall Street Journal people
Newsweek people
Writers from Detroit
Scripps National Spelling Bee participants
American cookbook writers
American restaurant critics